The Diadème class was a type of 74-gun ship of the line of the French Navy.

External links 
 

74-gun ship of the line classes
Ship of the line classes from France
 
Ship classes of the French Navy